Zenit is the sixth studio album by Austrian rapper RAF Camora, released on 1 November 2019, through Indipendenza and distributed through Groove Attack.

Background
Following the release of his fifth studio album Anthrazit and the subsequent re-release Anthrazit RR in 2017, the rapper announced the end of his career, after the release of Palmen aus Plastik 2 and one last solo album. In December 2018, he revealed that his last album will be titled Zenit. On August 23, 2019, a trailer was uploaded, directed by Shaho Casado, revealing the release date for the album for 1 November 2019.

Track listing
Adapted from Apple Music.

Charts

Weekly charts

Year-end charts

Certifications

References

2019 albums
German-language albums
RAF Camora albums